The Tărlung (in its upper course also: Ramura Mare) is a left tributary of the river Râul Negru in Romania. It discharges into the Râul Negru in Băcel.

Tributaries

The following rivers are tributaries to the river Tărlung (from source to mouth):

Left: Urlățel, Urlatul Mic, Doftana, Gârcin
Right: Capra Mică, Valea Cailor, Ramura Mică, Tesla, Dracu, Valea Satului, Zizin, Seaca, Valea Popii, Teliu, Dobârlău

References

Rivers of Romania
Rivers of Brașov County
Rivers of Covasna County